The Noyon-Tologoisky mine is one of the largest lead and zinc mines in Russia. The mine is located in southern Russia in Zabaykalsky Krai (In Russian - Забайкальский край). The mine has reserves amounting to 14 million tonnes of ore grading 1.79% lead and 1.55% zinc thus resulting 0.25 million tonnes of lead and 0.22 million tonnes of zinc. The mine also has reserves amounting to 30.4 million oz of silver.

References 

Lead and zinc mines in Russia
Zabaykalsky Krai
Buildings and structures in Zabaykalsky Krai